The subterranean or underground rivers of London are or were the direct or indirect tributaries of the upper estuary of the Thames (the Tideway) that were built over during the growth of the metropolis of London. They now flow through culverts, with some of them integral parts of London's sewerage system and diverted accordingly.

North of the Thames
sub-tributaries are shown indented
 Black Ditch
 Hackney Brook
 River Moselle (all three subtributaries via the Lea)
 Muswell Stream (sub-sub-tributary via Pymmes Brook)
 Lorteburn or Langbourne (now dry)
 River Walbrook
 River Fleet, crossing Fleet Street
 River Tyburn
 River Westbourne
 Tyburn Brook
 Counter's Creek
 Stamford Brook
Parrs Ditch
 River Brent (partially underground)
 River Rom (partially underground)

South of the Thames 
 Earl's Sluice
 River Peck
 River Neckinger
 River Effra
 Heathwall Ditch
 Falconbrook
 Graveney (sub tributary of River Wandle)
Norbury Brook
 River Quaggy (partially underground) (sub tributary of River Ravensbourne)
 Beverley Brook (partially underground)
 Sudbrook (partially underground)

Development
In June 2008, the office of Mayor of London published outline plans to reinstate some underground rivers. In January 2009, a partnership among the Environment Agency, Natural England, The River Restoration Centre, and the Greater London Authority set out a strategy for putting this into effect by creating the London Rivers Action Plan.

See also

Blue Ribbon Network—the major waterways of London
List of rivers of England
Subterranean London
Subterranean river
Tributaries of the River Thames

References

Further reading

External links

  

 
 

 
Subterranean London